Empas (hangul: 엠파스) was one of the popular total internet search tools and web portal sites in South Korea. The service was launched in 1998 by Knowledge Plant Corporation, which changed its name to Empas Corporation in 2004. The name Empas is a combination of e-media and compass.

Before its merger with Nate in 2009, Empas was one of South Korea's most popular web search engines, and competed with Yahoo! Korea, Daum, Nate, and Naver. Empas was the second most popular web portal in the country from 2000 to 2001, by unique page view, behind Yahoo! Korea. Since the dominance of Naver started in 2003, however, the market share of Empas declined, and by late 2005, it had fallen into the fifth place amongst the South Korean web portals. In 2006, aiming to check its main competition Naver's rapid expansion, SK Communications (which owned South Korea's popular social networking website Cyworld) acquired Empas on 19 October 2006.

With the reorganisation of SK Communications's business fields, Empas was merged with Nate.com, which was the original web portal of SK Communications, and became Nate on 1 March 2009.

References

External links
 Empas on 27 February 2009, days before it became the Nate website
 Nate, successor to Empas
 SK Communications, Inc.

Blog hosting services
Webmail
Online companies of South Korea
Internet search engines
Web portals